Stymbara, also known as Stuberra (Στυβέρρα) or Stubera, was a town on the frontier of Macedonia, which is by some assigned to Deuriopus, and by others to Pelagonia, which in the campaign of 200 BCE was the third encampment of the consul Sulpicius during the First Macedonian War. It was also the scene of action during the Third Macedonian War.

The site of Stymbara is near the modern Čepigovo, in North Macedonia.

References

Populated places in ancient Macedonia
Former populated places in the Balkans
Pelagonia
Upper Macedonia